The 2019 Military Bowl was a college football bowl game that was played on December 27, 2019, with kickoff at 12:00 p.m. EST on ESPN. It was the 12th edition of the Military Bowl, and was one of the 2019–20 bowl games concluding the 2019 FBS football season. Sponsored by defense contractor Northrop Grumman, the game was officially known as the Military Bowl presented by Northrop Grumman.

Teams
The game was played between the North Carolina Tar Heels from the Atlantic Coast Conference (ACC) and the Temple Owls from the American Athletic Conference (The American). It was the first time that North Carolina and Temple have played against each other.

North Carolina Tar Heels

North Carolina entered the game with a 6–6 record (4–4 in conference). The Tar Heels finished in a three-way tie for third place in the ACC's Coastal Division. North Carolina won its first two games, lost six of the next eight, then finished the regular season with two wins.

Temple Owls

Temple entered the game with an 8–4 record (5–3 in conference). The Owls finished in third place in the East Division of The American. Temple played four ranked teams during the 2019 season, recording wins against Maryland and Memphis while losing to SMU and Cincinnati.

Game summary

Statistics

References

External links

Media guide
Game statistics at statbroadcast.com

Military Bowl
Military Bowl
North Carolina Tar Heels football bowl games
Temple Owls football bowl games
Military Bowl
Military Bowl